Esporte Clube de Patos, commonly known as Esporte de Patos, or just as Esporte, is a Brazilian football club based in Patos, Paraíba state.

History
The club was founded on July 7, 1952 by former athletes from the defunct local club Botafogo de Patos. The founders were fans of Pernambuco football, thus the club adopted a similar name to Sport Club do Recife, and adopted the same colors and team kits as Clube Náutico Capibaribe's. Esporte won the Campeonato Paraibano second division in 2005, 2013, 2015 and 2018.

Achievements
 Campeonato Paraibano Second Division:
 Winners (4): 2005, 2013, 2015 and 2018

Stadium
Esporte Clube de Patos play their home games at Estádio José Cavalcanti. The stadium has a maximum capacity of 11,000 people.

References

External links
 

Association football clubs established in 1953
Football clubs in Paraíba
1953 establishments in Brazil